Even though the government of Oman does not keep statistics on religious affiliation, statistics from the CIA World Factbook state that adherents of Islam are in the majority at 85.9%, with Christianity at 6.5%, Hinduism at 5.5%, Buddhism at 0.8%, and Judaism less than 0.1%. Other religious affiliations have a proportion of 1% and the unaffiliated only 0.2%.

Islam 

In 2014, most Omani Muslims were followers of the Ibadi branch, followed by Sunnis. In 2021, an estimated 45% of Omani citizens were Ibadi and 45% were Sunni Muslims. Only 5% were Shias and 5% were of other faiths such as Hinduism or Christianity.

Other religions 

Virtually all non-Muslims in Oman are foreign workers.

Oman has communities of ethnic Indian Hindus. Muscat has two Hindu temples. One of them is over a hundred years old. There is a significant Sikh community in Oman. Though there are no permanent gurdwaras, many smaller ones in makeshift camps exist and are recognised by the government. The Government of India had signed an accord in 2008 with the Omani government to build a permanent gurdwara but as of now, little progress has been made.

Christian communities are centered in the major urban areas of Muscat, Sohar and Salalah. These include Catholic, Eastern Orthodox and various Protestant congregations, organizing along linguistic and ethnic lines. More than 50 different Christian groups, fellowships and assemblies are active in the Muscat metropolitan area, formed by migrant workers from Southeast Asia.

There is also a small Jewish community in Oman. Jainism, Buddhism and Zoroastrianism are also practiced in the country.

Freedom of religion

See also 
 Demographics of Oman
 Freedom of religion in Oman
 Islam in Oman
 Hinduism in Oman
 Christianity in Oman
 History of the Jews in Oman

References

External links 

Religion in Oman